How to Live With a Tiger is a studio album by Hail/Snail, released in 1993 by Funky Mushroom Records. It is a collaborative effort by musicians Susanne Lewis and Azalia Snail.

Track listing

Personnel 
Adapted from How to Live With a Tiger liner notes.

Musicians
 Susanne Lewis – vocals, guitar, bass guitar, keyboards, violin, drums, cymbals, production
 Azalia Snail – vocals, guitar, slide guitar, harmonica, keyboards, xylophone, cymbals, triangle, production

Additional musicians
 Robert Arnde – spoken word (1)
 Mike Burns – drums (2, 4, 8)
 Herbert Burt – vocals and bass guitar (11)
 Barry Chabala – flute, didgeridoo and piccolo (2, 8, 10)
 Eva Gaborchestra – strings (10)
 Gary Olson – trumpet and bugle (5, 11)
 Greg Talenfeld – keyboards (5)
Production and additional personnel
 Greg Talenfeld – engineering, mixing

Release history

References

External links 
 How to Live With a Tiger at Discogs (list of releases)

1993 albums
Collaborative albums
Azalia Snail albums